Dashtak-e Olya or Dashtak Olya or Dashtok-e Olya or Dashtak-e Bala or Dashtok-e Bala, both meaning "Upper Dashtak", may refer to:
 Dashtak-e Olya, Fars
 Dashtak-e Olya, Dana, Kohgiluyeh and Boyer-Ahmad Province
 Dashtak-e Olya, North Khorasan
 Dashtok-e Olya, Yazd